Indian Institute of Technology Jodhpur (IIT Jodhpur or IITJ) is a public technical university located in Jodhpur in the state of Rajasthan in India. It is one of the eight new Indian Institutes of Technology (IITs) established by the Ministry of Human Resource Development, Government of India under The Institutes of Technology (Amendment) Act, 2011 which declares these eight IITs as well as the conversion of the Institute of Technology, Banaras Hindu University to IIT. The Act was passed in the Lok Sabha on 24 March 2011 and by the Rajya Sabha on 30 April 2012.

History
IIT Jodhpur was first announced by the Central Government in July 2007, although the formal announcement was made in 2008, with IIT Kanpur mentoring IIT Jodhpur . In July 2008, the first academic session of IIT Jodhpur began at the IIT Kanpur campus, with 109 undergraduate students in Computer Science Engineering, Mechanical Engineering and Electrical Engineering. The institute was sanctioned as an IIT for Rajasthan, and not for Jodhpur in specific. It was after considering various cities, including Ajmer, Bikaner, Jaipur, Jodhpur, Kota and Udaipur that the Prof. Vijay Shankar Vyas led committee suggested Jodhpur as the location for the IIT in Rajasthan. In late 2009, the MHRD granted final approval for establishing the institute at Jodhpur.

A portion of the MBM Engineering College under JNV University, Jodhpur was identified as the location for the transit campus of IIT Jodhpur. In May 2010, classes of IIT Jodhpur were shifted from IIT Kanpur to the transit campus in Jodhpur. In July 2017, the academic and residential campuses of IIT Jodhpur were migrated to the permanent campus. Construction of the permanent campus is still in progress.

Campus

Permanent campus
IITJ is located about 24 km from Jodhpur city on National Highway 65 which connects Jodhpur to Nagaur. M. M. Pallam Raju, then Union Minister for Human Resources Development, laid the foundation stone on 16 April 2013.

The permanent campus is being built on a self-sustainable model, catering for its own energy and water requirements. The campus' masterplan got 'GRIHA Exemplary Performance Award' under 'Passive Architecture Design' category at the 8th GRIHA Summit held during 2–3 March 2017, at India Habitat Centre, New Delhi.

Transit academic campus

Until the first migration of IITJ to the permanent campus, IIT Jodhpur used to function from its transit campus, at the Department of Computer Science, MBM Engineering College. The transit campus is separate from the main campus of MBM Engineering College. The transit academic campus has 20 laboratories, six classrooms of 50-person capacity and four classrooms of 200-person capacity. Two of the four large classrooms have networking and video conferencing facility to facilitate video-conferencing lectures.

The academic campus' sports facilities include basketball, football, cricket, volleyball and badminton courts.

Transit residential campus

IIT Jodhpur had set up its transit residential campus at Kendranchal colony on New Pali Road, Jodhpur. Faculty and students used to reside in the transit residential campus, which had a dining facility and a health center. It has courts for outdoor and indoor sports. There was a computer center and library annexure.
 
The residential campus was connected to the academic campus by institute's buses which run at frequent intervals.

Organisation and administration

Governance

All IITs follow the same organization structure which has President of India as visitor at the top of the hierarchy. Directly under the president is the IIT Council. Under the IIT Council is the board of governors of each IIT.
Under the board of governors is the director, who is the chief academic and executive officer of the IIT. Under the director, in the organizational structure, comes the deputy director. Under the director and the deputy director, come the deans, heads of departments, registrar.

Departments 
The Institute has organised its academic activities to be conducted through 14 Departments & Schools. The departments are: 
 School of Artificial Intelligence & Data Science
 School of Management & Entrepreneurship
 School of Liberal Arts (SoLA) 
 Biosciences and Bioengineering 
 Chemical Engineering
 Chemistry 
 Civil and Infrastructure Engineering
 Computer Science & Engineering 
 Electrical Engineering 
 Humanities & Social Sciences 
 Metallurgical & Materials Engineering 
 Mathematics 
 Mechanical Engineering 
 Physics

Academics

Admissions 
For undergraduates, IIT Jodhpur offers BTech programs. Admissions to BTech programs are carried through Joint Entrance Examination, after completing 10+2 schooling.

For PG Courses, it offers MTech, MSc, MSc – MTech, MTech – PhD, MBA and PhD programs. The eligibility criteria for MTech involves degree in BTech, B.E. or BSc (Engineering) with at least 60% marks or 6.5/10 Cumulative Performance Index (CPI) or Cumulative Grade Point Average (CGPA). A valid GATE score is necessary for considering enrollment for MTech program. The MSc programs are administered through JAM exam with other minimum qualifying criterion in place.

Rankings
Indian Institute of Technology Jodhpur was ranked in 30th place among engineering colleges by the National Institutional Ranking Framework (NIRF) in 2022.

Research
At IIT Jodhpur sponsored research and development programs were and are carried out in Centers of Excellence in the areas of information and communication technology, energy, and systems sciences. The French government had shown its interest in helping IIT Jodhpur develop its research and academic institute. IIT Jodhpur has signed an Agreement on Academic Exchanges and MoU with Nara Institute of Science and Technology, Japan.

Student life

Cultural festivals
The annual inter-collegiate festival Ignus, usually held in the month of February is a cultural and technical festival hosted by the student body. It features competitions and events involving participants from all over the country, and concerts by eminent performers.

The annual inter-collegiate sports week, Varchas is another event organized by the student body. It involves participation from a number of institutes around the country in various sports competitions including athletics, badminton, basketball, football, cricket, chess, tennis, table tennis, volleyball and Jodhpur mini-marathon.

Students are also actively involved in activities like dramatics, literary arts, stargazing, music, quizzing, and fine arts. The Entrepreneurship Cell, which supports the growth of startups involves the student community in innovation and business activities as well.

See also
 List of universities and higher education colleges in Jodhpur
 Indian Institutes of Technology
 Arid Forest Research Institute (AFRI) Jodhpur

References

External links

 Official website, IIT Jodhpur

Jodhpur
Colleges in Jodhpur
Engineering colleges in Jodhpur
Educational institutions established in 2008
2008 establishments in Rajasthan